Jason Murray Kubler (born 19 May 1993) is an Australian professional tennis player. He has a career-high ATP singles ranking of No. 71 achieved on 27 February 2023 and a doubles ranking of No. 29 achieved on 20 February 2023. Kubler's career highlight came at the 2023 Australian Open, where he won his first Grand Slam doubles title as a wildcard alongside compatriot Rinky Hijikata.

Despite a promising junior career, which included the junior world No. 1 ranking and comparisons to Rafael Nadal, Kubler has spent the majority of his professional career on the lower circuits due to a hereditary knee condition that results in weakened meniscus around the joints. The condition has plagued Kubler throughout his career, resulting in six knee surgeries. Kubler also spent four years of his professional career playing exclusively on clay courts to avoid further structural damage to his knees.

Early life 
Kubler was born in Brisbane, Australia to an Australian father and a Filipina mother. His father, John, introduced Kubler to tennis at the age of five, but died of cancer when Kubler was eight years of age. Kubler grew up in the north Brisbane suburb of Mango Hill with an older brother and a younger sister.

Junior career
In 2009, Kubler became just the second player in history (after Rafael Nadal) to go undefeated through the World Youth Cup and Junior Davis Cup. Following his success at the Junior Davis Cup, Kubler won five titles in a row which saw his junior ranking rise to No. 3 in the world.

Kubler won six junior titles throughout his career and achieved the combined No.1 world ranking in May 2010 with a win–loss record of 67–17 in singles and 40–19 in doubles.

Professional career

2008–2013: Early career and injury concerns
Kubler made his professional debut in September 2008 at the Australia F7 Futures event on the ITF Men's Circuit, the third tier for men's professional tennis. Kubler won through qualifying to make his main draw professional debut but lost in the first round to compatriot Marinko Matosevic.

In 2010, following continued success on the junior circuit, Kubler was granted wildcards into the Brisbane International and Sydney International qualifying draws, but failed to win a match at either event. He was then awarded a wildcard to make his ATP Tour and Grand Slam debut at the 2010 Australian Open. Drawn against 24th seed Ivan Ljubičić, Kubler was handily beaten 6–2 6–1 6–1 in a lacklustre display.

In April, Kubler won the first main draw professional match of his career at the Australia F3 Futures event in Ipswich, where he went on to make the final, losing to Brydan Klein. Kubler's best results for the remainder of 2010 were a string of semi-final appearances at Netherlands F2, Italy F23, Portugal F5 and Spain F37 Futures events. He finished the season ranked No. 535 in the world.

Kubler missed the start of the 2011 Australian summer of tennis due to a knee injury. Further injuries during the year limited his play before he won the first professional title of his career at the USA F28 Futures event in Birmingham, defeating Yoshihito Nishioka in the final. Kubler won his second professional title the next week at the USA F29 Futures event in Niceville, salvaging an otherwise frustrating year with injury. He finished the 2011 season ranked No. 530 in the world.

Kubler began the 2012 season by entering four Futures tournaments in Florida after again bypassing the Australian summer. Kubler lost in the final of USA F1 to Jack Sock and USA F3 to Brian Baker before winning the USA F4 event in Palm Coast to cap off a promising start to the year. Kubler returned to Australia in March, where he lost the final of the Australia F3 event against Sam Groth but defeated John Millman to claim the Australia F4 title in Bundaberg. Kubler then travelled to Europe, to compete in further Futures tournaments and the first Challenger events of his career, where he made a quarter-final at the Todi Challenger in September. Following more success on the Futures tour, Kubler's world ranking steadily rose, peaking at a career-high No. 268 on 29 October 2012. He ended the 2012 season ranked No. 332 in the world.

In 2013, Kubler played in Futures tournaments throughout the United States, Spain, Great Britain, Australia, Italy and Egypt, but only on clay due to ongoing knee concerns. He won three Futures tournaments for the year, however his ranking dipped to No. 397 to end the season.

2014: Top 150 and exclusive clay court play 
Kubler again chose to miss the Australian summer of tennis, opting to play Futures events in Egypt and Spain. He entered six tournaments during this stretch, making the final of three and winning one. In March, Kubler qualified for the main draw of Challenger events in Panama and Barranquilla, but failed to win a match at either tournament. In April, he competed in further Challenger events in Savannah and Tallahassee, making the second round at both tournaments. In May, Kubler qualified for the ATP event in Düsseldorf, his first ATP World Tour event since the 2010 Australian Open. He won his first tour-level match by defeating Alessandro Giannessi, before losing to Denis Istomin in the second round. In June, Kubler returned to the Futures circuit and defeated the number one seed Kimmer Coppejans in the final of the Netherlands F3 in Breda. He broke into the top 200 for the first time on 25 August 2014 at No. 197. In September, Kubler made the quarter-final of the Biella Challenger and the following week, he won the Sibiu Challenger defeating Radu Albot in the final This was the first Challenger title of his career. In November, Kubler reached the final of the Lima Challenger, losing to Guido Pella. On 24 November, Kubler reached a career high ranking of No. 136 before finishing the 2014 season with a world ranking of No. 140. Kubler played a total of 29 tournaments in 14 countries in 2014, all of which were on clay, due to his ongoing knee problems.

2015-16: Rankings decline and further knee injuries 
Kubler skipped the Australian summer of tennis for a fifth consecutive year. He instead played a variety of Challenger events across South and North America, his best result being a quarter-final appearance in Sarasota. In May, Kubler attempted to qualify for the French Open, but lost in the first round to Tim Pütz. This was Kubler's first appearance at a Grand Slam event in five years, albeit in the qualifying tournament. In June, Kubler entered the qualifying tournament at Wimbledon, marking his first competitive appearance on the grass in three years. He defeated Rui Machado in straight sets in round 1 but was eliminated in the second round by Aleksandr Nedovyesov, who went on to qualify for the main draw. In September, Kubler attempted to qualify for the US Open, but lost in the opening round to Facundo Bagnis. This was Kubler's first competitive hard court appearance at any professional level in five years. Following the US Open, Kubler underwent knee surgery. A lacklustre year on the court and limited tournament play saw Kubler's ranking freefall to No. 544 to end the 2015 season.

After rehabbing from knee surgery, Kubler commenced the 2016 season by playing several Futures events in North America. He reached the quarter-final of USA F6 and semi-final of USA F8 in February. At USA F9 in March, Kubler retired in the first round. In May, just eight months after his last surgery, Kubler underwent the sixth knee operation of his career which side lined him for the rest of 2016. As a result, Kubler finished the year ranked outside the world's top 1000.

2017: Comeback from injury 
After a year out of the game and without a world ranking, Kubler returned to professional tennis in March at the Australia F2 and F3 Futures events in Canberra. In the lead up to the events, Kubler was frank about his future in the sport, commenting that another knee operation would likely mark the end of his career. After little success in Canberra, Kubler travelled to Europe in April for Futures events in Spain and Italy. Although Kubler managed to make a semi-final appearance at Spain F12, the highlight of his European trip was a doubles title with compatriot Alex Bolt at the Italy F14 tournament. This was Kubler's first professional trophy of any kind since 2014.

In October, Kubler won through qualifying at the Traralgon Challenger and made a remarkable run to the final after defeating two former top 100 players in Taro Daniel and Matthew Ebden. He defeated Alex Bolt in the final to claim his first Challenger title since 2014, which skyrocketed his ranking inside the world's top 350. Kubler was expected to compete in the Australian Wildcard Playoff in December for a spot in the 2018 Australian Open, but ultimately withdrew alongside a host of top-seeded players. Kubler finished the year ranked No. 341 in the world.

2018: Grand Slam return and Top 100 debut 
Kubler started his 2018 campaign at the Playford Challenger in South Australia, which he won after qualifying. The victory saw Kubler move inside the world's top 250 for the first time since 2015. Following an impressive run of form and a huge improvement in ranking over the past six months, Kubler was awarded the final wildcard into the 2018 Australian Open, his first Grand Slam appearance in eight years. Kubler faced 10th seed Pablo Carreno Busta in the first round, where he lost in a highly competitive four-set match. Kubler showed plenty of promise in the match, leading by a break in both the first and third sets, but failed to capitalise on his opportunities. Following the Australian Open, Kubler competed in nine Challenger events across Australia and Asia from February to May. His best results through this stretch included three semi-final appearances at the Burnie International, Quijing International and Seoul Open. Kubler improved his world ranking to No. 160 following the Asian swing, his best world ranking in three years.

At the French Open, Kubler lost in the first round of qualifying to Goncalo Oliveira. Following the French Open, Kubler proceeded to lose in the first round at his next three Challenger tournaments before making a semi-final run at the Ilkey Trophy, where he eventually lost to Oscar Otte. The result saw Kubler return to the world's top 150 for the first time in more than three years.

Kubler then entered the Wimbledon qualifying tournament and showed good form through his first two matches, defeating Arthur De Greef and Adam Pavlasek. In the final round of qualifying, Kubler defeated Canadian journeyman Peter Polansky in four-sets to qualify for the Wimbledon main-draw for the first time in his career. Heading into Wimbledon, Kubler's remarkable comeback journey started to gain attention and his story was captured by the ATP in a video feature titled "The Comeback Story of Jason Kubler". Kubler faced unseeded Argentinian Guido Pella in the first round, where he lost in four close sets. Following Wimbledon, Kubler entered the Winnipeg Challenger. As the fourth seed, Kubler dropped just one-set the whole tournament to claim his second Challenger title of the year, defeating Lucas Miedler in the final. The result saw Kubler move to No. 114 in the ATP rankings, eclipsing the career high he set way back in November 2014. To finish his Canadian tour, Kubler made the semi-final of the Gatineau Challenger before withdrawing from the Granby Challenger with knee soreness.

Kubler then attempted to qualify for the Washington Open, an ATP 500 event. Despite losing in the final round of qualifying, Kubler was granted entry into the main draw as a lucky loser after Nick Kyrgios withdrew with a hip injury. Taking Kyrgios' seeding, Kubler progressed through to the second round via a bye before losing in a third set tie-breaker to fellow Australian James Duckworth. In August, Kubler was granted a reciprocal wildcard into the US Open. In the lead up to the tournament, Kubler competed in the Vancouver Open on the Challenger circuit, where he was defeated by Dan Evans in the final. The result propelled Kubler into the top 100 for the first time, marking an 841 place ranking rise in the past 12 months. At the US Open, Kubler upset 19th seed Roberto Bautista Agut in straight sets in the first round to claim the first main draw grand slam win of his career. In the second round, Kubler was forced to retire in the fourth-set against American Taylor Fritz after rolling his ankle, which inadvertently caused further problems with his knees.

Kubler finished the season ranked No. 114 in the world.

2019: Early struggles, rankings decline and injury
Kubler was expected to compete in the Brisbane International, but withdrew from the event due to knee soreness. Kubler then attempted to qualify for the Sydney International, but fell in the first round to third seed Yoshihito Nishioka. For the second consecutive year, Kubler was awarded a wildcard into the 2019 Australian Open. With limited tournament preparation, Kubler was defeated in the first round of the Australian Open by unseeded Italian Thomas Fabbiano in four sets.

Following a three-month break from the tour due to knee ailments, Kubler returned in mid-April at the Kunming Challenger where he was defeated by James Duckworth in the third round. At the 2019 French Open, Kubler attempted to qualify but was defeated in the second round by Viktor Troicki. At Wimbledon, Kubler won through his first two matches in qualifying but fell at the last hurdle to Yasutaka Uchiyama in five sets. Following his poor results, Kubler's ranking dipped to No. 211 in the world. In July, Kubler made back-to-back finals on the Challenger tour in Winnetka and Gatineau. Kubler lost the Winnetka final to top-seeded American Bradley Klahn but bounced back to win the Gatineau tournament without dropping a set. The result helped steer Kubler back inside the top 200 at No. 189 in the ATP rankings. Kubler was expected to contest the Challenger event in Granby, but withdrew due to a wrist injury.

Kubler played no further tournaments in 2019 and finished with the year ranked No. 261 in the world.

2020-21: Limited play due to COVID-19 pandemic, sixth Challenger title 
Following a first-round exit in Australian Open qualifying, Kubler made a run to the semi-final of the Burnie Challenger before losing to Yannick Hanfmann in straight sets. Kubler played three further Challenger events before the Tour was suspended until the end of July due to the COVID-19 pandemic. Kubler returned to Australia following the suspension and predominately played tournaments in the UTR Pro Tennis Series. He ended the 2020 season ranked No. 259 in the world.

Kubler started the 2021 season at the Murray River Open on the ATP Tour after receiving a wildcard entry. At the tournament he scored an upset victory over 9th seeded Italian Lorenzo Sonego in three sets, his first in an ATP main draw since the 2018 US Open. He lost in the second round to Ricardas Berankis. Kubler then attempted to qualify for the 2021 Australian Open, but was defeated in the second round by Sergiy Stakhovsky.

In July, he reached the final of the Nur-Sultan II Challenger, but retired early in the second set against Andrey Kuznetsov. The following week at the Lexington Challenger Kubler won the sixth Challenger title of his career, defeating Alejandro Tabilo in three-sets.

In August 2021, Kubler tested positive for COVID-19. He returned to the tour in September, but failed to progress beyond the second round in any tournament for the remainder of the season.

Kubler ended 2021 ranked No. 206 in the world.

2022: Mixed doubles Major & ATP doubles finals, Wimbledon fourth round, first Top 10 win
Kubler attempted to qualify for the 2022 Australian Open, but was eliminated in the second round by Tomas Martin Etcheverry. Kubler was awarded a pair of wildcards into the doubles and mixed doubles events however, with fellow compatriots Christopher O'Connell and Jaimee Fourlis respectively. Kubler and O'Connell reached the third round as a pairing before withdrawing from the event. In the mixed doubles event, Kubler and Fourlis went on a fairy tale run to make the final and were bidding the become the first all-Australian duo to win the mixed doubles championship since 2013, but were ultimately defeated by fifth seeds Kristina Mladenovic and Ivan Dodig.

In late March and early April, Kubler won back-to-back Futures events in Canberra and in May made the semi-final of the Zagreb Challenger. The results steered his ranking inside the top 200.

On his 29th birthday, Kubler qualified for the main draw of the 2022 French Open for the first time, and was the only Australian to qualify at the 2022 event. Kubler scored his first main draw Grand Slam win since the 2018 US Open when he defeated Denis Kudla in straight sets. He lost in the second round to 10th seed Cameron Norrie. Kubler moved to No. 119 in the world following Roland Garros.

In June, Kubler won the seventh Challenger title of his career at Little Rock, defeating Taiwan's Wu Tung-lin in the final. The following week he reached the final of the Orlando Challenger, but retired during the third-set due to stomach issues. The results propelled Kubler back in the top 100 for the first time since October 2018, when he peaked at world No. 91.

After narrowly missing out on direct entry into Wimbledon, Kubler entered the qualifying tournament as the second seed. He needed a deciding set in his first two matches to progress, but cruised past Elias Ymer in straight sets during the final round to confirm his place in the main draw. It was the second time Kubler qualified for Wimbledon, having done so in 2018. Kubler faced British 28th seed Dan Evans in the first round, defeating the home crowd favourite in straight sets. This was Kubler's first main draw win at Wimbledon in his career. In the second round, he defeated fellow qualifier Dennis Novak in straight sets to reach the third round of a Grand Slam for the first time in his career. His dream run continued in the third round, defeating Jack Sock in five sets to reach the second week of a Grand Slam for the first time. In the fourth round, Kubler was defeated by 11th seeded American Taylor Fritz in straight sets. Kubler's result at Wimbledon earned him the biggest payday of his career, taking home £190,000 ($230,000). Despite his fourth round appearance, Kubler slid outside the top 100 due to the removal of ranking points at the 2022 Championships. The ATP, WTA and ITF all stripped the tournament of ranking points, following the All England Lawn Tennis Club's decision to ban Russian and Belarusian players from competing.

At the Hall of Fame Open Kubler defeated compatriot Jordan Thompson in straight sets in the first round. He then defeated top seed and World No. 9 Felix Auger-Aliassime in three sets to reach his first ATP quarterfinal, saving a match point in the process during the final set tiebreak. The victory over Auger-Aliassime also marked his first career Top 10 win. He then defeated compatriot James Duckworth in straight sets to reach his maiden ATP semi-final, where he lost to 3rd seed Alexander Bublik. Later that month, at the 2022 Atlanta Open, Kubler reached the final in doubles with compatriot John Peers, but lost to 2nd seeded Australian duo Thanasi Kokkinakis and Nick Kyrgios. 

At the US Open, Kubler defeated Mikael Ymer in four sets in the first round, his first main draw win at the event since 2018. In the second round, Kubler was defeated by American 22nd seed and eventual semi-finalist Frances Tiafoe in straight sets. In September, at the San Diego Open, Kubler reached his second ATP doubles final of the season, this time with fellow Australian Luke Saville. They lost in the final to American duo Nathaniel Lammons and Jackson Withrow in straight sets.

Kubler finished the 2022 season ranked No.107 in the world, the best end-of-year ranking of his career.

2023: Australian Open doubles title, career-high rankings
Kubler made his 2023 United Cup debut representing team Australia, following the withdrawal of Nick Kyrgios from the event. In the group stage, Kubler defeated World No. 27 Dan Evans and World No. 39 Albert Ramos-Viñolas in his rubbers. Despite his strong results, Australia failed to progress past the group stage. Following his performance, Kubler returned to the top 100, rising to a career-high ranking of No. 86 in the world. At the Adelaide International 2 event, Kubler received a wildcard into the main draw and continued his good form, defeating Tomas Martin Etcheverry in the first round. He was then defeated by the 6th seed, Miomir Kecmanovic in three tight sets.

Kubler received a wildcard into the 2023 Australian Open, marking his first appearance at the event in four years. In the first round, he defeated Sebastian Baez in straight sets, his first main draw win at the Australian Open in his career. In the second round, he lost in four sets to Russian 18th seed Karen Khachanov. 

In the doubles event, Kubler and fellow Australian Rinky Hijikata entered the tournament as wildcards. The pair made a run through the draw to reach their first major final, recording notable wins over three seeded teams, sixth seeds Lloyd Glasspool and Harri Heliövaara in the second round, world No. 1 duo Wesley Koolhof and Neal Skupski in the quarterfinals and eight seeds Marcel Granollers and Horacio Zeballos in the semifinals. The pair also saved a match point in the third round against Tomislav Brkić and Gonzalo Escobar. Kubler and Hijikata defeated Hugo Nys and Jan Zieliński in the final to win their maiden Grand Slam title, becoming the fifth unseeded team to win an Australian Open men’s doubles title in the Open era and only the second as wildcards. The result propelled Kubler 130 places up the doubles rankings to a career-high No. 33 in the world. Kubler also achieved a career-high ranking in singles following the Australian Open, at No. 79 in the world.

In February, Kubler returned to the ATP Tour at the Qatar Open, where he lost in the second round to second seed Felix Auger-Aliassime.

Men's doubles: 1 (1 title)

Mixed doubles: 1 (1 runner-up)

ATP career finals

Doubles: 3 (1 title, 2 runner-ups)

ATP Challenger and ITF Futures finals

Singles: 34 (19–16)

Doubles: 6 (5–1)

Record against top 10 players

Kubler's record against players who have been ranked in the top 10, with those who are active in boldface. Only ATP Tour main draw matches are considered:

Wins over top 10 players
Kubler has a  record against players who were ranked in the top 10 at the time the match was played.

Grand Slam performance timeline

Singles 
Current through the 2023 Australian Open

Doubles

References

External links

 
 
 
 The Age Feature on Jason Kubler

Australian male tennis players
Tennis players from Brisbane
Australian people of German descent
Australian people of Filipino descent
1993 births
Living people